Deepak Menon is an Indian actor known for his works primarily in the Malayalam cinema. He is the first Supreme Court lawyer to become a hero in Malayalam movie industry. He entered into movie industry through director Kamal's movie Minnaminnikoottam starring Jayasurya, Indrajith and Narain. After doing a couple of movies in Hindi, he came back to Malayalam movie industry being the hero in Rakshapurushan which tells the life of a police officer.

Filmography

References

Indian male film actors
Living people
Male actors in Malayalam cinema
Year of birth missing (living people)